This is a list of Thai actresses. It is customary for Thais to be grouped by their given name, not their family name, even if they have taken a Western name.

A
Ammara Assawanon
Ann Thongprasom
Apasiri Nitipon
Apinya Sakuljaroensuk
Aranya Namwong
Arunee Nanthiwat

B
Bongkot Kongmalai

C
Chalida Vijitvongthong
Chanidapa Pongsilpipat
Chermarn Boonyasak
 Cherprang Areekul
Chintara Sukapatana
Cindy Burbridge
Cris Horwang
Chippy Sirin Preediyanon

D
Davika Hoorne
Daran Boonyasak

I
Intira Jaroenpura

J
Janie Tienphosuwan
Jennie Panhan
Jessica Pasaphan
Jintara Poonlarp
Jintara Sukapat
Jarunee Sooksawat

K
Kaew Korravee
Kanokkorn Jaicheun
Kanya Rattanapetch
Kathaleeya McIntosh
Katreeya English
Kemisara Paladesh
Kesarin Chaichalermpol
Kessarin Ektawatkul
Khemanit Jamikorn
Khemupsorn Sirisukha
Kimberley Anne Woltemas

L
Lada Engchawadechasilp
Lalita Panyopas

M
Mai Charoenpura
Marsha Wattanapanich
Maylada Susri
Matika Arthakornsiripho
Morakot Kittisara
Myria Benedetti

N
Namthip Jongrachatawiboon
Naowarat Yuktanan
Napakpapha Nakprasitte
Narikun Ketprapakorn
Natapohn Tameeruks
Nattasha Nauljam
Nichaphat Chatchaipholrat
Nicole Theriault
Nittha Jirayungyurn
Nuttanicha Dungwattanawanich

P
Parinya Kiatbusaba
Patcharapa Chaichue
Patharawarin Timkul
Paula Taylor
Peechaya Wattanamontree
Peeranee Kongthai
Petchara Chaowarat
Phimonrat Phisarayabud
Phiyada Jutharattanakul
Pimchanok Luevisadpaibul
Pitchanart Sakakorn
Porntip Papanai
Pumwaree Yodkamol
Praya Lundberg
 Preechaya Pongthananikorn
Pimprapa Tangprabhaporn
 Ploypailin Thangprabhaporn

R
Ranee Campen
Rasri Balenciaga
Rhatha Phongam
Runglawan Thonahongsa

S
Sananthachat Thanapatpisal
Sammy Cowell
Sara Malakul Lane
Savika Chaiyadej
Savitree Suttichanond
Sinjai Plengpanich
Siriyakorn Pukkavesh
Sonia Couling
Sririta Jensen
Stella Malucchi
Suangporn jaturaphut
Sushar Manaying
Supaksorn Chaimongkol
Suppanad Jittaleela
Sutatta Udomsilp
Suvanant Kongying

T
Taksaorn Paksukcharern
Tata Young
Tipnaree Weerawatnodom

U
Ungsumalynn Sirapatsakmetha
Urassaya Sperbund

V
Viphada Jatuyosporn

W
Wannarot Sonthichai
Warattaya Nilkuha
Woranut Wongsawan
Worranit Thawornwong 

Actors
Lists of actresses
Actresses